The Canadian territory of Northwest Territories first required its residents to register their motor vehicles and display licence plates in 1941. , plates are issued by the Northwest Territories Department of Infrastructure through its Driver and Vehicle Services branch. Only rear plates have been required since June 1, 1993.

In 1970, to celebrate the centennial of the territory, a unique polar bear-shaped plate was introduced. The basic bear shape has been retained ever since, and the plate is now a registered trademark of the Government of the Northwest Territories.

The current design, which consists of graphic and material updates, was rolled out on July 1, 2010. The blue-and-white plates prior to the update were made of steel and lack graphic sheeting technology that would make them visible in the dark. Current plates are made with aluminum and incorporated visual updates as well as a new slogan.

Influence on Nunavut plate design

In April 1999, the territory of Nunavut was created from the eastern part of the Northwest Territories. The new territory adopted a virtually identical bear-shaped licence plate, following an agreement between the governments of the two territories. In 2011, the Government of Nunavut decided to discontinue the bear shape and replace it with a conventional rectangular design, which was introduced in July 2012.

Passenger baseplates

1945 to 1974
The first Northwest Territories licence plate that complied with these standards was issued five years beforehand, in 1951. The current bear-shaped plates feature the standard mounting holes.

1975 to present

Commercial plates

Non-passenger plates

Veteran plate

References

External links
Northwest Territories licence plates, 1969–present

Northwest Territories
Transport in the Northwest Territories
Government of the Northwest Territories